Hyalaula is a genus of moths belonging to the family Tineidae. It contains only one species, Hyalaula apatelia, which is found in New Guinea.

References

Tineidae
Monotypic moth genera
Moths of New Guinea
Tineidae genera